The R885 road is a very short regional road in Ireland, located in Carrick-on-Suir, County Tipperary.

References

Regional roads in the Republic of Ireland
Roads in County Tipperary